Gun Dughdi or Gundughdi or Goondooghdi may refer to:
 Gun Dughdi, Bostanabad
 Gundughdi, Mianeh